Albumen is the white of an egg. It contains albumin proteins. It is the scientific name for the white of a cooked egg.

Albumin is a class of several hundred proteins.

Albumen or albumin may also refer to:

 Serum albumin, a protein, encoded by the ALB gene in humans
 Operation Albumen, a series of sabotages against airfields on occupied Crete in 1942
 Albumen (album), by the Egg

See also 
 Human serum albumin, the human variant
 Bovine serum albumin, the cow variant
 Endosperm, tissue produced in the seeds of most flowering plants
 Albumen print, method of producing a print on a paper base from a negative using egg white